Bill Downie (3 April 1904 – 26 November 1952) was an Australian rules footballer who played with Carlton in the Victorian Football League (VFL).

Downie was born Thomas William McKenna, the son of Katherine McKenna (1890–1932) and took the name Downie when his mother married Albert Cornelius Downie in 1908.

Downie died in an accident when a trench he was working in collapsed.

Notes

External links 

Bill Downie's profile at Blueseum

1904 births
1952 deaths
Carlton Football Club players
Australian rules footballers from Melbourne
People from Carlton, Victoria